Gosbeck Wood is a  biological Site of Special Scientific Interest east of Needham Market in Suffolk.

This is an ancient coppice with standards wood mainly on boulder clay, with some areas of sandy soil. Dog's mercury is dominant in the ground flora, and other plants include spurge laurel, wood spurge, herb paris and hairy woodrush.

A footpath goes through the wood.

References

Sites of Special Scientific Interest in Suffolk